The Nicolaus Copernicus University Library was established on August 24, 1945, alongside the Nicolaus Copernicus University, Toruń, Poland. The Library is the coordinator of Kujawsko-Pomorska Digital Library.

Ranking of the State Committee for Scientific Research (KBN)

Based on the results of the evaluation of scientific achievements, the State Committee for Scientific Research granted the NCU Library category 3, which places it in the company of other university libraries in Kraków, Poznań and Warsaw.

Awards and recognitions 

In 2002, the NCU Library was honoured with the medal of "Bibliotheca Magna Perennisque" for its "contribution to Polish librarianship."

In December 2002, the NCU Library webpage won third place in a competition for the best Polish library websites, in a research libraries category, organised under the auspices of the Polish Librarians Association.

See also
 Nicolaus Copernicus University in Toruń
 The Nicolaus Copernicus University Press
 Open access in Poland

External links
 Official website of the Library, available in English
 Official website of the University

Buildings and structures in Toruń
Academic libraries in Poland
Library